Line Damkjær Kruse (born 7 January 1988) is a Danish badminton player. She won silver medal in girls' doubles event at the 2007 European Junior Championships, and bronze medal in mixed doubles event.

Achievements

European Championships 
Women's doubles

European Junior Championships 
Girls' doubles

Mixed doubles

BWF Grand Prix 
The BWF Grand Prix had two levels, the Grand Prix and Grand Prix Gold. It was a series of badminton tournaments sanctioned by the Badminton World Federation (BWF) and played between 2007 and 2017.

Women's doubles

  BWF Grand Prix Gold tournament
  BWF Grand Prix tournament

BWF International Challenge/Series 
Women's doubles

Mixed doubles

  BWF International Challenge tournament
  BWF International Series tournament
  BWF Future Series tournament

References

External links 

 

1988 births
Living people
Sportspeople from Aarhus
Danish female badminton players